Gap analysis is a business assessment tool.

Gap analysis may also refer to:

Gap analysis (conservation), a tool used in wildlife conservation to identify gaps in conservation lands
Gap Analysis Program in the U.S.
Capability gap analysis in systems engineering